Hellertown station was a train station in Hellertown, Pennsylvania on the former Bethlehem Line. The station was last used by SEPTA diesel service and was closed in July 1981 after SEPTA terminated all diesel routes. The station was razed on December 6, 1982, and no trace of it remains.

In 1871, the station was one of 33 stations of a 54.6-mile line of the North Penn Railroad that ran from Berks Street in Philadelphia to Bethlehem Union Station.

References

Railway stations in the United States opened in 1877
Former SEPTA Regional Rail stations
Railway stations closed in 1981
Former railway stations in Pennsylvania